The Tower Lifeboat Station is a lifeboat station on the River Thames in London, UK, operated by the Royal National Lifeboat Institution (RNLI). It is located at Victoria Embankment on the North Bank of the Thames, next to Waterloo Bridge.

The pier takes its name from the original RNLI lifeboat station which opened in 2002 further downstream at Tower Pier, next to the Tower of London. In 2006 the lifeboat station moved to its present location at Waterloo Pier, formerly known as the Waterloo Police Pier.

History 
A new search and rescue service for the River Thames was announced on 22 January 2001. The RNLI was asked by the Government to provide lifeboat cover, the first time it had been specifically asked to cover a river rather than estuarial waters. This came as a result of the findings of the Thames Safety Inquiries into the collision between the pleasure cruiser Marchioness and the dredger Bowbelle, which resulted in the loss of 51 lives in 1989.

In 2002 a lifeboat station was established at Tower Pier. An E class lifeboat was placed on service at 12:00 on 2 January when the new search and rescue arrangements for the tidal reaches of the River Thames came into operation.

The station is staffed continuously to provide an immediate response and is coordinated by the Maritime and Coastguard Agency from a Port of London Authority operations room at the Thames Barrier. Two of the three-person crew at each station are full-time and the third crew member is a volunteer. This enables the boats to arrive at any incident within 15 minutes.

A special framed certificate, signed by Surgeon Rear Admiral F Golden and the Chief Executive, was presented to Helmsman Mike Sinacola, Mechanic Michael Neild and Crew Member Will Lawrie for the first aid carried out on a seriously injured woman in front of a shocked crowd of onlookers during a service on 2 May 2004.

New facilities on the Thames at Waterloo Pier were completed in 2006.

Fleet

See also
 Royal National Lifeboat Institution

References

External links
 The official page of the Tower lifeboat at the RNLI website

London River Services
Infrastructure in London
Piers in London
Lifeboat stations in London
Victoria Embankment
City of Westminster